Chenopodium vulvaria, the stinking goosefoot or notchweed, is a foul-smelling plant or weed. The plant is a member of the genus Chenopodium, the goosefoots.

Distribution
Its native distribution is practically pan-European and extends eastward to Pakistan. However, it has also naturalised in Australia, California and parts of South America.

Ecology
It is an annual weed of bare soil and is not tolerant of competition. It is largely found where soil has been disturbed and in waste places by the sides of roads and walls.

Etymology
Chenopodium vulvaria is mentioned in Linnaeus' Species Plantarum (1753). The specific epithet comes from the Latin term vulva. This may be due to an association between the fishy odor of the plant and that of a bacterially imbalanced human vagina. Indeed, the plant contains trimethylamine, which has been suggested to be "the substance mainly responsible for the fishy odor often associated with bacterial vaginosis". Many descriptions of the plant report it as having a fish-like odor.

Nicolas Lemery (1721) stated that the name vulvaria is due to the medicinal uses of the plant, which according to Grieve (1931) is used in the treatment of "hysteria and nervous troubles connected with women's ailments [...and] to cure barrenness". Van Ravelingen (1644), on the other hand, noted that according to Matthias de l'Obel (1538-1616), "those who have rubbed [Chenopodium vulvaria] between their fingers are often asked whether they have dealt with any filthy woman, because it all stinks like the filthy and unclean whores, so that it is commonly called vagina-herb (kutten-cruydt)".

See also 

 List of taxa named after human genitals

References

External links

Jepson Manual Treatment
USDA Plants Profile
Flora of North America

vulvaria
Medicinal plants of Asia
Medicinal plants of Europe
Plants described in 1753
Taxa named by Carl Linnaeus